The Meeting is a 2012 Nigerian romantic comedy drama film produced by Rita Dominic & Mildred Okwo and directed by Mildred Okwo. It stars Femi Jacobs, Rita Dominic, Linda Ejiofor, Kehinde Bankole and Jide Kosoko with special appearances from Nse Ikpe Etim, Kate Henshaw and Chinedu Ikedieze. It received 6 nominations at the 9th Africa Movie Academy Awards and won the award for the category Achievement In Make-Up.

Plot
The film opens at the Nnamdi Azikiwe International Airport, Abuja, with a phone conversation between Mr. Makinde Esho (Femi Jacobs) and his managing director (Jide Kosoko). Makinde is reminded by his MD about how important it is for him to get an authorization from the Ministry of Land, and return to Lagos with a positive feedback. Just as Makinde is about to board a taxi, he is interrupted by Ejura (Linda Ejiofor), a female Corp member who pleads to share the ride, as she is short on cash and there is a long queue at the ATM. Makinde refuses at first, but after much persuasion from Ejura, he reluctantly agrees. Even though Ejura had promised earlier to remain quiet during the ride, her inquisitive nature gives Makinde facial expressions that prompt answers and eventually start a conversation.

Mr Makinde arrives at the Ministry of Land and encounters Mr. Ugor (Chinedu Ikedieze) being forced out of the building by security operatives. Makinde is in awe but manages to find his way to the reception desk to meet the minister's discourteous secretary, Clara Ikemba (Rita Dominic). He is unapologetically informed by Clara that his meeting, which was originally scheduled for 9:30 am, has been moved to 4:30 pm. Makinde retires his stance and joins the other appointees who are all seated to see the minister. While waiting, Clara informs the appointees that she sells recharge cards and cold drinks to cater for their needs as they wait to see the minister, Ejura also calls Mr Makinde to thank him for the ride he gave to her earlier while he has lunch at a nearby eatery. Several hours pass and Makinde is yet to hear a word from the secretary about his rescheduled meeting. He decides to inquire about it from her but to his surprise, she informs him rudely that the minister has already left the office. Makinde argues that she could have told him and the others waiting, instead of making people waste their precious time. Clara replies him "OYO (meaning On Your Own) is their case", a slang which means every man is responsible to himself and she has no business telling them to wait or go home. The meeting is eventually rescheduled for the following day. Makinde checks into a hotel. While trying to fight boredom, Ejura calls and eventually joins Makinde in the hotel in a bid to keep him company.

Makinde is set to give his presentation to the minister on Tuesday morning, but just as the secretary is about to inform the minister of his presence, a group of Igbo kinsmen arrive at the reception. Hours pass on and the kinsmen conclude their meeting with the minister only for Clara to tell Makinde after a confrontation that the minister is having his lunch and can not see anyone at the moment. Bolarinwa (Nse Ikpe Etim) stylishly enters the reception room to the amazement of everyone present. From her brief chat with Clara It is quite clear that she is a close friend to the secretary and the minister's mistress. Shortly after the conversation she is granted entry to see the minister. After a while, Makinde stands up to inquire from the secretary again only to be told she is closing. Makinde asks about his appointment and she tells him the minister left 30 minutes ago. He tells her that she should have informed him and other people waiting and give replies with her signature sentence "OYO is their case".

Makinde is forced to spend the night in Abuja. He later invites Ejura over to his hotel after she calls to inquire about his presentation. So starts their love story over five days of Makinde trying unsuccessfully to see the minister. While returning from a movie, they ultimately kiss and cuddle till the next morning. Makinde leaves for his appointment after asking her what she sees in him despite their age difference. He is later able to make his presentation to the minister and also catch up with his daughter's graduation ceremony. He later flies back to Abuja to spend his holiday with Ejura. The film ends with both kissing at the rooftop of a construction site, Ejura was supervising.

Cast
Femi Jacobs as Makinde Esho
Rita Dominic as Clara Ikemba
Linda Ejiofor as Ejura
Kehinde Bankole as Kikelomo
Jide Kosoko as MD
Nse Ikpe Etim as Bolarinwa
Chika Chukwu as Mrs Kachukwu
Collins Richard as Jolomi
Kate Henshaw as Mrs Ikomi
Basorge Tariah Jr. as Professor Akpan Udofia
Amina Ndim as Hajia
Chinedu Ikedieze as Mr Ugor

Reception

Critical reception
The Meeting received critical acclaim. Nollywood Reinvented gave the film 78% and wrote "The Meeting is an embodiment of the things that we hope Nollywood will one day attain in all her movies: splendid acting with all round commendable performances, priority being placed on the story over the celebrities, music that has so much character, and an actual tangible original storyline". Sodas & Popcorn wrote "The meeting is simple. It has a very original ‘Nigerian story’ and one of the best screenplays I have seen in a while. A story of love, tribalism, preferential treatment which has loads of comical spectacles". Myne Whiteman of Romance Meets Life gave the film 4.5 out of 5 and commented "the movie ties everything so well together that I forgive the little foibles. It was refreshing to see new faces in the lead roles, and they were very good actors as well. Linda Ejiofor and Femi Jacobs have a chemistry that draws you in, delivering their dialogue with perfect timing and great acting". Toni Kan of DStv wrote "The Meeting is a beautiful movie driven by its story line and well chosen cast of characters. It is a movie that sets out with pretty high ambitions and it manages to achieve them all".

Awards
The Meeting received six nominations at the 9th Africa Movie Academy Awards including awards for categories Achievement In Costume Design, Achievement In Makeup, Best Nigerian Film, Best Actress In A Supporting Role for Linda Ejiofor, Best Actor In A Leading Role for Femi Jacobs and Best Actress In A Leading Role for Rita Dominic. It eventually won just the award for the category Achievement In Make-Up. It also received 11 nominations at the 2013 Nollywood Movies Awards, Rita Dominic won award for Best actress in a film for her role in The Meeting at the 2013 Nigeria Entertainment Awards.

See also
 List of Nigerian films of 2012

References

External links
 
 

2012 films
English-language Nigerian films
Films shot in Abuja
Films set in Abuja
Films shot in Lagos
Films set in Lagos
2012 romantic comedy-drama films
Yoruba-language films
Igbo-language films
2010s political drama films
Political drama films
Nigerian romantic comedy-drama films
Nigerian political satire films
Best Makeup Africa Movie Academy Award winners
2010s satirical films
2012 comedy films
2012 drama films
2010s English-language films